William Thorndike (January 22, 1795  July 12, 1835) was a Massachusetts lawyer and politician who served in the Massachusetts House of Representatives, and as a member and President of the Massachusetts Senate.

See also
 53rd Massachusetts General Court (1832)

References

Massachusetts lawyers
People from Beverly, Massachusetts
People from Bath, Maine
Members of the Massachusetts House of Representatives
Massachusetts state senators
Presidents of the Massachusetts Senate
Harvard University alumni
1795 births
1835 deaths
19th-century American politicians
19th-century American lawyers